Complications – Trilogy of Intricacy is an EP by the Norwegian avant-garde progressive metal band Age of Silence. It was released on October 15, 2005. The concept of the album revolves around the opening of a shopping mall in hell.

Track listing
"The Idea of Independence and the Reason Why it's Austere" – 6:24
"Mr. M, Man of Muzak" – 4:09
"Vouchers, Coupons and the End of a Shopping Session" – 5:29

Line-Up
Lars Are "Lazare" Nedland – vocals
Jan Axel "Hellhammer" Blomberg – drums
Lars "Eikind" Si – bass, backing vocals
Joacim "Extant" Solheim – guitar
Helge "Kobbergaard" Haugen – guitar
Andy Winter - keyboards

References

Age of Silence albums
2005 EPs